Lyons is a city in Toombs County, Georgia, United States. The population was 4,367 at the 2010 census, up from 4,169 in 2000. The city is the county seat of Toombs County.

Lyons is part of the Vidalia Micropolitan Statistical Area.

History
Lyons was founded circa 1890 as a depot on the Central of Georgia Railway. The community was named after one Mr. Lyons, a railroad official. It was incorporated on December 9, 1897. In 1905, Lyons was designated seat of the newly formed Toombs County.

Geography
Lyons is located at  (32.204287, -82.322732).

The city is located at the junction of U.S. Routes 1 and 280. U.S. 1 runs north-south through the center of town, leading north 12 mi (19 km) to Oak Park just south of its junction with Interstate 16 and south 31 mi (50 km) to Baxley. U.S. 280 runs east-west through the city as West Liberty Avenue, leading southeast 15 mi (24 km) to Reidsville and west 6 mi (10 km) to Vidalia. Other highways that run through the city include Georgia State Routes 152, 178, and 292. 

Demographics

2020 census

As of the 2020 United States census, there were 4,239 people, 1,607 households, and 1,013 families residing in the city.

2000 census
As of the census of 2000, there were 4,169 people, 1,547 households, and 986 families residing in the city. The racial makeup of the city was 59.25% White, 32.38% African American, 0.36% Native American, 0.17% Asian, 0.02% Pacific Islander, 7.22% from other races, and 0.60% from two or more races. Hispanic or Latino of any race were 15.06% of the population.

There were 1,547 households, out of which 33.3% had children under the age of 18 living with them, 36.7% were married couples living together, 21.5% had a female householder with no husband present, and 36.2% were non-families. 31.4% of all households were made up of individuals, and 12.8% had someone living alone who was 65 years of age or older. The average household size was 2.55 and the average family size was 3.18.

In the city, the population was spread out, with 28.9% under the age of 18, 10.0% from 18 to 24, 27.0% from 25 to 44, 19.7% from 45 to 64, and 14.4% who were 65 years of age or older. The median age was 33 years. For every 100 females, there were 92.4 males. For every 100 females age 18 and over, there were 89.0 males.

The median income for a household in the city was $21,202, and the median income for a family was $26,044. Males had a median income of $22,254 versus $16,611 for females. The per capita income for the city was $12,364. About 28.6% of families and 37.1% of the population were below the poverty line, including 54.8% of those under age 18 and 20.4% of those age 65 or over.

Education

Toombs County School District 
The Toombs County School District holds pre-school to grade twelve, and consists of three elementary schools, a middle school, and a high school. The district has 177 full-time teachers and over 2,856 students.

Notable people
Jeremy Beasley - MLB Pitcher
Cecile Bledsoe - Arkansas politician
Mel Blount - NFL player who played with the Pittsburgh Steelers
Craig Campbell - country music singer
Don Collins - former professional baseball player
John P. Coursey - Brigadier general and naval aviator in the Marine Corps
Nick Eason  - NFL player currently with the Pittsburgh Steelers
Mads Krügger - professional wrestler
Travares Tillman - professional football player

References

Cities in Georgia (U.S. state)
Cities in Toombs County, Georgia
County seats in Georgia (U.S. state)
Vidalia, Georgia, micropolitan area